Oakes Ames (January 10, 1804 – May 8, 1873) was an American businessman, investor, and politician. He was a member of the United States House of Representatives from Massachusetts.  As a congressman, he is credited by many historians as being the single most important influence in the building of the Union Pacific portion of the transcontinental railroad. He is also noted for the subsequent scandal that alleged the improper sale of stock of the railroad's construction company.

Biography
Ames was born in Easton, Massachusetts, the son of Susanna (Angier) Ames and Oliver Ames, Sr., a blacksmith who had built a business of making shovels, the Ames Shovel Shop, and became nicknamed "King of Spades". In his youth, he obtained a public school education and later worked in the family workshops to learn each step of the manufacturing process. He eventually became a partner in the business, and with his brother Oliver Ames, Jr. he established the firm Oliver Ames & Sons. Driven by the settlement of the Midwest, by the discovery of gold in California and Australia, as well as by railroad construction, the shovel manufacturing business boomed. During the Civil War, the firm prospered with contracts for swords, shovels, and other tools and implements. Ames made a large fortune.

He was influential in the establishment of the Republican Party in Massachusetts. In 1860, he became a member of the executive council of Massachusetts, and from 1863 to 1873 he served as a U.S. Congressman from the Second District of Massachusetts. In Congress, he became a member of the Committee on Railroads during the early building of the transcontinental railroad. In 1865, President Abraham Lincoln appealed to him to take control of the Union Pacific (UP) portion of the project, which had become mired down because of the war, and had built only  of track.

Through his influence he obtained contracts for his family firm in the construction of the Union Pacific and staked nearly all the family's holdings as capitalization for the project. The contracts were later transferred to the Credit Mobilier Company of America after Ames ousted its founder Thomas Durant. His brother Oliver was appointed president of the UP in 1866. The railroad was completed in 1869.

In 1872, it was disclosed Ames sold shares in Credit Mobilier to fellow congressmen at a price greatly below the market value of the stock. The subsequent public scandal led to a House investigation, which formally recommended expulsion. On February 28, 1873, the House passed a resolution formally censuring Ames "in seeking to secure congressional attention to the affairs of a corporation in which he was interested, and whose interest directly depended upon the legislation of Congress, by inducing members of Congress to invest in the stocks of said corporation." Detractors referred to him as "Hoax Ames." Ames died soon afterward at North Easton, Massachusetts, May 5, 1873.

On May 10, 1883, the 14th anniversary of the completion of the railroad, the state legislature of Massachusetts passed a resolution exonerating Ames. His son Oliver Ames served as Governor from 1887 to 1890.

Honors

The contributions of Ames and his brother Oliver in the building of the Union Pacific are commemorated in the Oliver and Oakes Ames Monument at Sherman Summit, near Laramie, Wyoming, along the original route. The pyramidal monument was designed by famous architect Henry Hobson Richardson (who designed a number of projects for the Ames family) with sculpted plaques of the Ames brothers by Augustus Saint-Gaudens. At the time of its construction, the monument was located at the highest point attained by the UP's transcontinental route.  With a change in the route of the railroad, the monument today is not on any major transportation route.

The city of Ames, Iowa is named for Oakes, as is likely the community of Ames, Nebraska. The public high school in Easton, Massachusetts is named Oliver Ames High School.

See also
 Oakes Ames Memorial Hall (Easton, Massachusetts)
 Ames Free Library (Easton, Massachusetts)
 Ames Shovel Shop
 List of United States representatives expelled, censured, or reprimanded
 List of federal political scandals in the United States

References

Further reading
 Oakes Ames: A Memoir. (Cambridge, 1884)

External links 

Oakes Ames Oakes Ames's work on orchids (by Oakes Ames, grandson of the Oakes Ames featured in this Wikipedia article).
National Park Service site on Oliver and Oakes Ames
Oliver and Oakes Ames Monument in Wyoming
Harvard University papers of Oakes Ames
Iowa State University Oakes Ames photographs
PBS the Credit Mobilier Scandal
Spencer Marks The Ames Family of North Easton, Massachusetts
Historic Unity Church Ames Family Tree

1804 births
1873 deaths
19th-century American politicians
19th-century American railroad executives
American financiers
American investors
American manufacturing businesspeople
American railway entrepreneurs
Ames, Iowa
Businesspeople from Massachusetts
Butler–Ames family
Censured or reprimanded members of the United States House of Representatives
Members of the Massachusetts Governor's Council
People from Easton, Massachusetts
People of Massachusetts in the American Civil War
Republican Party members of the United States House of Representatives from Massachusetts
Union Pacific Railroad people